The Body Works was a Canadian educational children's television series which was produced by TVOntario and Access. The show debuted in 1980 and consisted of 40 ten-minute episodes. The show taught exercise, health, and nutrition to children.

External links
 Rickstv.com - The Body Works
 

1980 Canadian television series debuts
1980s Canadian children's television series
Canadian children's education television series
TVO original programming
Health education television series